Lyn Hejinian (born May 17, 1941) is an American poet, essayist, translator and publisher. She is often associated with the Language poets and is known for her landmark work My Life (Sun & Moon, 1987, original version Burning Deck, 1980), as well as her book of essays, The Language of Inquiry (University of California Press, 2000).

Life
Hejinian was born in the San Francisco Bay Area and lives in Berkeley, California, with her husband, composer/musician Larry Ochs. She has published over a dozen books of poetry and numerous books of essays as well as two volumes of translations of the Russian poet Arkadii Dragomoshchenko. From 1976 to 1984 she was editor of Tuumba Press, and from 1981 to 1999 she co-edited (with Barrett Watten) Poetics Journal. She is the co-editor of Atelos, which publishes cross-genre collaborations between poets and other artists.

Hejinian has worked on a number of collaborative projects with painters, musicians and filmmakers. She teaches poetics and contemporary literature at University of California, Berkeley. Hejinian has lectured in Russia and around Europe. She has received grants and awards from the California Arts Council, the Academy of American Poets, the Poetry Fund, the National Endowment of the Arts, and the Guggenheim Foundation.

She sponsors the NBC Thursday Night DeCal course at UC Berkeley.

Bibliography 

 a gRReat adventure. Self-published, 1972.
 A Thought is the Bride of What Thinking. Berkeley, CA: Tuumba Press, 1976.
 A Mask of Motion. Providence, RI: Burning Deck, 1977.
 Gesualdo. Berkeley, CA: Tuumba Press, 1978.
 Writing is an Aid to Memory. Great Barrington, MA: The Figures, 1978.
 My Life. Providence, RI: Burning Deck, 1980.
 The Guard. Berkeley, CA: Tuumba Press, 1984.
 Redo. Grenada, Miss.: Salt-Works Press, 1984.
 My Life. (revised and updated) LA: Sun & Moon Press, 1987.
 Individuals. (written with Kit Robinson) Tucson, AZ: Chax Press, 1988.
 
 The Hunt. La Lasuna: Zasterle Press, 1991.
 Oxota: A Short Russian Novel. Great Barrington, MA: The Figures, 1991. 
 The Cell. LA: Sun & Moon Press, 1992.
 Jour de Chasse. trans. Pierre Alferi. Cahiers de Royaumont, 1992.
 The Cold of Poetry. LA: Sun & Moon Press, 1994.
 Two Stein Talks. Santa Fe, NM: Weaselsleeves Press, 1996.
 Wicker. (written with Jack Collom) Boulder, CO: Rodent Press. 1996.
 The Little Book of A Thousand Eyes. Boulder, CO: Smoke-Proof Press, 1996.
 Writing is an Aid to Memory. Reprint, Los Angeles: Sun & Moon Press, 1996.
 Guide, Grammar, Watch, and The Thirty Nights. Western Australia: Folio, 1996.
 A Book from A Border Comedy. Los Angeles: Seeing Eye Books, 1997.
 The Traveler and the Hill, and the Hill. (with Emilie Clark) New York: Granary Books, 1998.
 Sight. (written with Leslie Scalapino) Washington DC: Edge Books, 1999.
 Happily. Sausalito, CA: Post-Apollo Press, 2000.
 Chartings. (written with Ray DiPalma) Tucson: Chax Press, 2000.
 Sunflower. (written with Jack Collom) Great Barrington MA: The Figures, 2000. 
 The Language of Inquiry. Berkeley: University of California Press, 2000. 
 The Beginner. New York: Spectacular Books, 2001.
 A Border Comedy. New York: Granary Books, 2001.
 My Life. Reprints Sun & Moon edition; Los Angeles: Green Integer, 2002.
 Slowly. Berkeley: Tuumba Press, 2002.
 The Beginner. Berkeley: Tuumba Press, 2002.
 The Fatalist. Richmond, CA: Omnidawn Publishing, 2003. 
 My Life in the Nineties. New York: Shark Books, 2003. 
 Saga/Circus. Richmond, CA: Omnidawn Publishing, 2008. 
 The Book of a Thousand Eyes. Richmond, CA: Omnidawn Publishing, 2012. 
 The Unfollowing. Oakland, CA: Omnidawn Publishing, 2016. 
 Positions of the Sun. New York, NY: Belladonna, 2018. 
 Tribunal. Chicago, IL: University of Chicago Press, 2019. 
 Oxota: A Short Russian Novel. Middletown, CN: Wesleyan University Press, 2019.

Translations
 Description. poems by Arkadii Dragomoshchenko. LA: Sun & Moon Press, 1990.
 Arkadii Dragomoshchenko selections in Third Wave: The New Russian Poetry, ed. Kent Johnson and Stephen Ashby. Ann Arbor: University of Michigan Press, 1992.
 Xenia. poems by Arkadii Dragomoshchenko. LA: Sun & Moon Press. 1994.

Critical studies and reviews of Hejinian's workLeningrad''

References

Further reading
 Hartwell, Michael, and Lyn Hejinian. "The Rejection of Closure." The Manifesto in Literature. Ed. Thomas Riggs. Vol. 3: Activism, Unrest, and the Neo-Avant-Garde. Detroit: St. James Press, 2013. 238–240. Gale Virtual Reference Library.
 Quinn, Richard. "Hejinian, Lyn (1941– )." Contemporary American Women Poets: An A-to-Z Guide. Ed. Catherine Cucinella. Westport, CT: Greenwood Press, 2002. [178]-182. Gale Virtual Reference Library.
 "Yet we insist that life is full of happy chance.": Lyn Hejinian. Poetry for Students. Ed. Ira Mark Milne. Vol. 27. Detroit: Gale, 2008. 290–317. Gale Virtual Reference Library.

External links
 Lyn Hejinian at the Poetry Foundation
 Lyn Hejinian at the Academy of American Poets
 Lyn Hejinian Papers
 

1941 births
20th-century American poets
21st-century American poets
Iowa Writers' Workshop faculty
Language poets
Living people
Roberta C. Holloway Lecturer in the Practice of Poetry
Russian–English translators
University of California, Berkeley College of Letters and Science faculty
Writers from the San Francisco Bay Area
American women poets
20th-century American women writers
21st-century American women writers
20th-century American translators
21st-century American translators